Richard Myers (1901–1977) was a songwriter. Together with Jack Lawrence he wrote "Hold My Hand," which was nominated for the 1954 Academy Award for Best Original Song.

Songs
"My Darling", song by with lyrics by Edward Heyman 1932

References

1901 births
1977 deaths
20th-century American composers